The 1986 Portuguese presidential election was held on 26 January, the second round took place on 16 February.

This was closest presidential election ever held in Portugal and was won by the Socialist Mário Soares, who initially had no more than 5% at opinion polls.

In first round was easily won by Freitas do Amaral, supported by all the right-wing parties, while Soares defeated the other two left-wing candidates, the former Prime-Minister Maria de Lourdes Pintasilgo –the first woman to be a candidate to the Portuguese presidency – and Salgado Zenha (supported by outgoing president António Ramalho Eanes, founder of the short-lived Democratic Renewal Party, and by the Portuguese Communist Party, whose candidate, Ângelo Veloso, left the race some days before the poll). Both these candidates supported Soares in the second round.

Soares did not achieve the majority of the voting in any district, as the left-wing strongholds in the South of Portugal voted for Zenha due to his support by the Communist Party.

As results for the second round were counted, the urban vote, traditionally more left-wing, overcame the early lead of Freitas do Amaral by less than 140,000 votes, and Soares became president on 9 March 1986.

, this was the only time a Portuguese presidential election was taken into a second round.

Procedure
Any Portuguese citizen over 35 years old has the opportunity to run for president. In order to do so it is necessary to gather between 7500 and 15000 signatures and submit them to the Portuguese Constitutional Court.

According to the Portuguese Constitution, to be elected, a candidate needs a majority of votes. If no candidate gets this majority there will take place a second round between the two most voted candidates.

Candidates

Official candidates
Diogo Freitas do Amaral, Interim Prime Minister between December 1980 and January 1981, leader of the Democratic and Social Centre between 1974 and 1983, supported by the Democratic and Social Centre and the Social Democratic Party;
Mário Soares, former Prime Minister between 1976-1978 and 1983-1985, leader of the Socialist Party between 1973 and 1985, supported by the Socialist Party;
Francisco Salgado Zenha, former Minister of Justice in Vasco Gonçalves governments, supported by the Portuguese Communist Party and Democratic Renewal Party;
Maria de Lourdes Pintasilgo, Independent candidate, former Prime Minister between 1979 and 1980;
Ângelo Veloso, Official candidate of the Portuguese Communist Party, Left the race to support Salgado Zenha;

Unsuccessful candidacies 
There were also three candidates rejected by the Portuguese Constitutional Court for not complying with the legal requirements, those were:

 Carmelinda Pereira;
 Luís Carlos Franco;
 Álvaro Manuel Nunes;

Campaign period

Party slogans

Candidates' debates

1st round

2nd round

Opinion polls

1st round

2nd round

Results

|-
!style="background-color:#E9E9E9" align=left colspan="2" rowspan="2"|Candidates
!style="background-color:#E9E9E9" align=left rowspan="2"|Supporting parties 	
!style="background-color:#E9E9E9" align=right colspan="2"|First round
!style="background-color:#E9E9E9" align=right colspan="2"|Second round
|-
!style="background-color:#E9E9E9" align=right|Votes
!style="background-color:#E9E9E9" align=right|%
!style="background-color:#E9E9E9" align=right|Votes
!style="background-color:#E9E9E9" align=right|%
|-
|style="width: 10px" bgcolor=#0093DD align="center" | 
|align=left|Diogo Freitas do Amaral
|align=left|Democratic and Social Centre, Social Democratic Party
|align="right" |2,629,597
|align="right" |46.31
|align="right" |2,872,064	
|align="right" |48.82
|-
|style="width: 10px" bgcolor=#FF66FF align="center" | 
|align=left|Mário Soares
|align=left|Socialist Party
|align="right" |1,443,683
|align="right" |25.43
|align="right" |3,010,756
|align="right" |51.18
|-
|style="width: 10px" bgcolor=#00B233 align="center" | 
|align=left|Francisco Salgado Zenha
|align=left|Democratic Renewal Party, Portuguese Communist Party
|align="right" |1,185,867
|align="right" |20.88
|colspan="2" rowspan="3"| 
|-
|style="width: 10px" bgcolor=#777777 align="center" |
|align=left|Maria de Lourdes Pintasilgo
|align=left|Independent
|align="right" |418,961
|align="right" |7.38
|-
|style="width: 10px" bgcolor=red align="center" |
|align=left|Ângelo Veloso
|align=left|Portuguese Communist Party
|colspan="2" align="center" |left the race
|-
|colspan="3" align=left style="background-color:#E9E9E9"|Total valid
|width="65" align="right" style="background-color:#E9E9E9"|5,678,108
|width="40" align="right" style="background-color:#E9E9E9"|100.00
|width="65" align="right" style="background-color:#E9E9E9"|5,882,820
|width="40" align="right" style="background-color:#E9E9E9"|100.00
|-
|align=right colspan="3"|Blank ballots
|width="65" align="right" |46,334
|width="40" align="right" |0.81
|width="65" align="right" |33,844
|width="40" align="right" |0.57
|-
|align=right colspan="3" |Invalid ballots
|width="65" align="right"|18,292
|width="40" align="right"|0.32
|width="65" align="right"|20,436
|width="40" align="right"|0.34
|-
|colspan="3" align=left style="background-color:#E9E9E9"|Total 
|width="65" align="right" style="background-color:#E9E9E9"|5,742,734 
|width="40" align="right" style="background-color:#E9E9E9"|
|width="65" align="right" style="background-color:#E9E9E9"|5,937,100 
|width="40" align="right" style="background-color:#E9E9E9"|
|-
|colspan=3|Registered voters/turnout
||7,617,257||75.38
||7,612,633||77.99
|-
| colspan=7 align=left|Left the race in favor of Salgado Zenha.
|-
|colspan=7 align=left|Source: Comissão Nacional de Eleições (1st Round); Comissão Nacional de Eleições (2nd Round)
|}

Maps

Notes

References

External links
Portuguese Electoral Commission

See also
 President of Portugal
 Portugal
 Politics of Portugal

1986
1986 elections in Portugal
January 1986 events in Europe
February 1986 events in Europe